Ronald Howden (born 23 March 1967 in Toronto) competed for team Britain at the 1988 Winter Olympics. He competed in the Men's 15 km Classical Nordic skiing, placing 73 out 92.

References

1967 births
Cross-country skiers at the 1988 Winter Olympics
Skiers from Toronto
Living people
Olympic cross-country skiers of Great Britain
British male cross-country skiers